Joshua John Miller (born December 26, 1974) is an American actor, screenwriter, author, and director. Miller co-writes with his life partner M. A. Fortin; the two wrote the screenplay for the 2015 horror comedy The Final Girls, and the USA Network drama series Queen of the South.

Personal life
Miller was born in Los Angeles to actor and Pulitzer Prize-winning playwright Jason Miller and actress and Playboy pin-up Susan Bernard. Miller's half-brother is actor Jason Patric, and his maternal grandfather was photographer Bruno Bernard, also known as "Bernard of Hollywood". His father was of Irish and German descent, and his mother is Jewish.

Miller is gay and, as of 2013, is in a relationship with fellow screenwriter M. A. Fortin.

Career
Miller began appearing in films and television when he was eight years old. His first film role was in Halloween III: Season of the Witch. He would go on to star in such films as River's Edge, Near Dark, Class of 1999, and Teen Witch. Miller also made guest appearances on several popular television shows, including 21 Jump Street, The Wonder Years, The Greatest American Hero, Highway to Heaven (for which he received a Young Artist Award in 1985), and Growing Pains (hence a popular misconception that he is a relative of Jeremy Miller, who portrayed Ben Seaver on that series; they are not related). Miller appeared in several plays, and was involved in dance from a very early age. He starred in the Los Angeles Ballet Company's production of The Nutcracker for three consecutive seasons beginning at age seven, and later appeared as a dancer in Janet Jackson's Grammy Award-winning Rhythm Nation 1814 video.

Miller attended Yale University and Antioch University, and studied creative writing at the University of California, Los Angeles. In 1997, he published a pseudo-autobiographical novel called The Mao Game about a fifteen-year-old child star attempting to cope with heroin addiction, memories of past sexual abuse, and the impending death of his grandmother, who has been diagnosed with cancer. In 1999, The Mao Game was adapted into a film, written and directed by Miller, and co-produced by Whoopi Goldberg. The film starred Miller, Kirstie Alley, and Piper Laurie, and featured Miller's mother, Susan Bernard, in a brief, uncredited cameo. It toured the festival circuit, and garnered mixed reviews from critics.

In December 2003, he completed his MFA in creative writing at the University of Iowa. He was awarded the Capote Fellowship, and was also chosen for the Houghton-Mifflin Fellowship Award. He has also written articles for Harper's Bazaar, Playboy, and Esquire. In 2007, Miller appeared as Jinky in The Wizard of Gore. He has written a second novel, titled Ash.

Miller collaborated with M. A. Fortin to write the DreamWorks TV and Fox production Howl. Miller and Fortin then co-wrote the short film Dawn (2014), which was directed by actress Rose McGowan and premiered at the Sundance Film Festival. The two also co-wrote the screenplay and executive produced the 2015 horror comedy film The Final Girls, directed by Todd Strauss-Schulson and starring Taissa Farmiga and Malin Åkerman. Miller and Fortin wrote the pilot for the USA Network drama series Queen of the South. Miller also serves as an executive producer for the series, which began airing on June 23, 2016.

Filmography

As actor

As writer

Bibliography
 The Mao Game (1997)

Awards and nominations

References

External links
 

1974 births
20th-century American male actors
21st-century American male actors
American male child actors
American male film actors
American male television actors
American male screenwriters
American male writers
Screenwriters from California
American people of Irish descent
American people of German-Jewish descent
American gay actors
American gay writers
Jewish American male actors
Living people
Male actors from Los Angeles
University of California, Los Angeles alumni
Writers from Los Angeles
LGBT people from California
American LGBT screenwriters
Film directors from Los Angeles
21st-century American Jews